Alf's Baby, also known as Her Three Bachelors, is a 1953 British comedy film directed by Maclean Rogers and starring Jerry Desmonde, Pauline Stroud and Olive Sloane. It was made by ACT Films, and released as a second feature.

Plot
Three bachelors raise a baby who grows into an eligible young woman.

Cast
 Jerry Desmonde as Alf Donkin  
 Pauline Stroud as Pamela Weston  
 Olive Sloane as Mrs. Matthews  
 Peter Hammond as Tim Barton  
 Sandra Dorne as Enid  
 Roy Purcell as Sergeant Bob Mackett  
 C. Denier Warren as Cedric Donkin  
 Mark Daly as Will Donkin  
 Roddy Hughes as Mr. Prendergast 
 Sebastian Cabot as Osmonde  
 Michael Ripper as Mike

References

Bibliography
 Chibnall, Steve & McFarlane, Brian. The British 'B' Film. Palgrave MacMillan, 2009.

External links

1953 films
British comedy films
1953 comedy films
Films directed by Maclean Rogers
British black-and-white films
1950s English-language films
1950s British films